Marcus Schmickler (born November 15, 1968, in Cologne) is a German composer, musician, and producer. He is also known under the pseudonym Pluramon.

Background
In 1968 he was born as the son of an industrial salesman and a baker's daughter in Cologne. Soon his parents moved to Kuerten where he met the music of Karlheinz Stockhausen. In 1991, after spending a year in London, he started studying music in Cologne and became a member of the seminal collective Kontakta. 1992 his first solo release appeared with the French label Odd Size. In 1995, he was co-initiator of the A-Musik record store and the DJ collective Brüsseler-Platz-10a-Musik, together with Georg Odijk and Jan St. Werner (Mouse on Mars).

Since 1995 he works as a composer, for film theater and radio play. In 1996 he released one of the first fully digitally produced post-rock albums under the pseudonym Pluramon on the German label Mille Plateaux. After a concert in Cologne, in 1998, he became a member of the 12-piece electro-acoustic ensemble MIMEO (Music in Movement Electronic Orchestra). In 1999, he completed his studies in electronic music with Hans Ulrich Humpert and the composition with Johannes Fritsch with a thesis on Gottfried Michael Koenig.

In 2000 he published jointly with Thomas Lehn the CD Bart, which was reviewed to be one of the most impressive synth-improv performances ever. In September 2001 he recorded the Pluramon album Dreams Top Rock with American singer Julee Cruise and went on an extended tour through South America on the initiative of Goethe-Institut in 2003. Since 2004 he has been working on various theater projects, with among others, Felix Ensslin . He created numerous works of electronic music, and compositions for choir, chamber ensemble, and orchestra. In 2009 he composed Bonn Patternizationon on behalf of the International Year of Astronomy 2009 and the German Music Council, a sonification with projections based on astrophysical data. Since 2015, Schmickler has worked as an assistant professor at the Institute For Music and Media in Düsseldorf.

Marcus Schmickler has received prizes and scholarships, including the Ars Electronica, the state of North Rhine-Westphalia and curated festival programs in the Academy of Arts, Berlin and the ZKM. He was a longtime member of the jury of the Deutscher Musikrat (German Music Council, a member of the International Music Council). As an author, he wrote articles on various topics of electronic music.

Partial discography

 Solo
Richters Patterns, Tochnit Aleph, 2020
Particle/Matter-Wave/Energy, Kompakt, 2019
Rule of Inference, a-Musik, 2011
Bari Workshop, Presto?!, 2011
Palace of Marvels [queered pitch], Editions Mego, 2010
Altars of Science, Editions Mego, 2007
DEMOS for Choir, a-Musik, 2005
Param, a-Musik, 2001
Sator Rotas, a-Musik, 1999
Wabi Sabi, a-Musik, 1996
Onea Gako, Odd Size, 1993
 As Pluramon
The Monstrous Surplus, Karaoke Kalk, 2007
Dreams Top Rock, Karaoke Kalk, 2003
Bitsand Riders, Mille Plateaux, 2000
Render Bandits, Mille Plateaux, 1998
Pickup Canyon, Mille Plateaux, 1996
 With MIMEO
Wigry, Bolt Records, 2011
Sight, Cathnor, 2008
Lifting Concrete Lightly, Serpentine Gallery, 2004
The Hands of Caravaggio, Erstwhile Records, 2001
Electric Table & Chair, Grob, 2000

 Collaborations
 Marcus Schmicker/Thomas Lehn "Neue Bilder", microton, 2017
 Marcus Schmickler John Tilbury "Timekeepers", A-Musik, 2015
 Marcus Schmickler Julian Rohrhuber "Politiken der Frequenz", Tochnit Aleph / Editions Mego, 2014
 Marcus Schmickler/Thomas Lehn Live Double Séance [Antaa Kalojen Uida], Editions Mego, 2011
 R/S USA, Pan, 2011
 Schmickler/Gratkowski/Nabatov Deployment, Leo Records, 2010
 Marcus Schmickler/Thomas Lehn Navigation im Hypertext, a-Musik, 2008
 Marcus Schmickler/Thomas Lehn Kölner Kranz, a-Musik, 2008
 R/S One(snow mud rain), Erstwhile Records, 2007
 Marcus Schmickler with Hayden Chisholm Amazing Daze, Häpna, 2007
 Marc Ushmi Doshhammer Mixes (without Label), 2007
 Claudio Bohorquez, Solo and Accompaniment, Aulos, 2006
 Marcus Schmickler/John Tilbury Variety, a-Musik, 2005
 Schmickler/Lehn/Rowe/Nakamura Untitled, Erstwhile Records, 2004
 Schmickler/Lehn Amplify Balance 7 CD Box, Erstwhile Records, 2004
 Marcus Schmickler/Thomas Lehn / Keith Rowe Rabbit Run, Erstwhile Records, 2003
 Marc Ushmi meets Reverend Galloway Mein Kopf verlor ein Dach, Whatness, 2003
 Soundcultures, Suhrkamp, 2003
 Marc Ushmi/Thomas Brinkmann Chevrolet Corvette Max Ernst, 2001
 Marcus Schmickler/Thomas Lehn Bart, Erstwhile Records, 2000
 2:3 Oswald Wiener zum 65. Geburtstag, Supposé, 2000
 Prix Ars Electronica Cyber Arts 2000 Ars Electronica Center, 2000
 Brüsseler Platz-10a-Musik  Wittener Tage für neue Kammermusik, WDR, 1998
 Brüsseler Platz-10a-Musik sT, Sieben, 1997
 Brüsseler Platz-10a-Musik / Agentur Bilwet 1000 Fehler, Supposé, 1996
 Pol Baby I Will Make You Sweat Odd Size, 1995
 Pol Transomuba, Odd Size, 1994
 Kontakta s/T, Odd Size, 1992

References

External links
 http://www.piethopraxis.org/ Official Site
 Homepage of Pluramon
 Faculty home page
 Marcus Schmickler exclusive generative audio piece for the Composing with process series on Ràdio Web MACBA
 Marcus Schmickler's "Ontology of vibration: economics, music and number" podcast on Ràdio Web MACBA
 
 

1968 births
21st-century classical composers
German electronic musicians
Living people
Male classical composers
21st-century German male musicians